The 13th Sustainment Command (Expeditionary)—the "Lucky 13th"—is a U.S. Army modular sustainment command which serves as a forward presence for expeditionary operations for a theater, or in support of a regional combatant commander. Expeditionary sustainment commands (ESC), such as the 13th, synchronize distribution of supplies and services within their operational areas and provides distribution oversight. Formed at Fort Hood, Texas when the 1st Logistics Command deployed to Vietnam, the organization then known as the 13th Support Brigade was initially responsible for the training of technical services units to assume combat service support missions in Southeast Asia.

As the Army redefined the missions of its logistics forces in response to building towards a 16-division Army, it was designated a corps support command (COSCOM). In 1992 the 13th COSCOM deployed to Somalia as part of Operation Restore Hope where for the first time a COSCOM was given the mission to provide theater-level support in a major U.S. operation. The 13th ESC has deployed to Iraq, Afghanistan, and Kuwait, and served as the logistics command for hurricane relief efforts in support of the American people after hurricanes Hurricane Katrina and Hurricane Rita devastated the Gulf Coast.

Organization
The 13th Sustainment Command (Expeditionary) was constituted on 11 August 1965 in the Regular Army, and activated 24 September 1965 at Fort Hood, Texas as the 13th Support Brigade. The 13th Support Brigade was formed as the nation's involvement in Vietnam increased, and was tasked with the training of technical services units to assume combat service support missions in Southeast Asia. With reorganization from the "technical service" concept to the "combat service to the Army" concept, functional training of units was decentralized in the Continental Army Command to post, camp and station level.

The command continued to evolve due to increased missions and changing roles. Along with similar units, it was redesignated as 13th Corps Support Command (COSCOM) on 21 June 1975, and then the 13th Support Command (Corps) on 16 October 1980. As part of Army Transformation, it was reflagged to its current configuration as the 13th Sustainment Command (Expeditionary) during a formal ceremony on 23 February 2006.

Insignia
The distinctive unit insignia was originally approved for the 13th Support Brigade on 25 August 1966. It was redesignated for the 13th Corps Support Command and amended to revise the symbolism effective 21 June 1975. The insignia was redesignated for the 13th Support Command on 17 October 1980. It was redesignated for the 13th Corps Support Command on 10 August 1989. The insignia was redesignated for the 13th Sustainment Command on 7 March 2006.

Description/Blazon
A gold color metal and enamel insignia 1 1/8 inches (2.86 cm) in height overall consisting of a blue star of thirteen points, one point up, bearing a gold saltire between three smaller gold saltires, all above a gold scroll, the middle section surmounting the star, inscribed "SERVICE TO THE SOLDIER" in red letters.

Symbolism
The star of thirteen points refers to the unit's numerical designation. The central saltire stands for the command and the three smaller saltires for the Corps which it supports. The colors gold (for buff), red and blue are used in the flags of combat service support units. They refer to the supply and service, maintenance, transportation and other support functions of the command.

Shoulder Sleeve Insignia (Patch)
The shoulder sleeve insignia was originally approved for the 13th Support Brigade on 11 August 1966. It was redesignated for the 13th Corps Support Command and amended to revise the symbolism effective 21 June 1975. The insignia was redesignated for the 13th Support Command on 17 October 1980. It was redesignated for the 13th Corps Support Command on 10 August 1989. The insignia was redesignated for the 13th Sustainment Command on 7 March 2006.

Description/Blazon
On a yellow octagon with a 1/8 inch (.32 cm) blue border 2 1/2 inches (6.35 cm) in height overall, a scarlet saltire throughout surmounted by a blue star of thirteen points fimbriated in yellow.

Symbolism
The octagon reinforced by the saltire refers to the unit's mission of supporting the combat, combat support and combat service support organizations of the Corps. The star symbolizes the many far reaching missions of the command, and having thirteen points, the star also alludes to its numerical designation. The octagon is a symbol of regeneration; it alludes to the combat service support functions of the unit as consistently renewing the strength and vigor of the Corps.

Yellow (substituted for Quartermaster buff) alludes to the supply and service functions of the command. Scarlet (substituted for Ordnance crimson and Transportation brick red) alludes to the maintenance and transportation functions of the command. The blue represents other support rendered by the command. This combination identifies the colors which are used in the flags of combat service support organizations.

Earthquake Relief, Managua, Nicaragua
Soldiers of the 13th ESC first deployed as the 13th Support Brigade in response to the Managua earthquake, where its soldiers served at Camp Christine, Managua, Nicaragua, assisting in disaster relief from 23 December 1972 to 19 January 1973. Units of the 13th deployed in Nicaragua included:
21st Evacuation Hospital
255th Medical Detachment
528th Transportation Company (-)

Desert Storm
Though the headquarters did not deploy to Desert Shield and Desert Storm, units from the 13th COSCOM began to deploy in the fall of 1990 to Saudi Arabia to provide combat support and combat service support during the Gulf War. During Operation Desert Calm and Operation Provide Comfort, soldiers of the 13th ESC deployed to the Persian Gulf area. In 1992, 13th COSCOM soldiers deployed to Cuba to aid Haitian refugees during Operation Safe Harbor, and later assisted victims of Hurricane Andrew in Florida. 13th ESC soldiers led the way as III Corps units deployed to Kuwait to train and ensure the peace in support of Operation Intrinsic Action.

Operation Restore Hope
In 1992, the U.S. Central Command established Unified Task Force Somalia (UNITAF) in light of the worsening situation in Somalia and 13th COSCOM was called to duty. 13th COSCOM Commander Brig. Gen. Billy K. Solomon deployed along with a portion of the 13th COSCOM headquarters to Mogadishu to serve as the nucleus of Joint Task Force Support Command, the first time where a COSCOM was given the mission to provide theater-level support. Soldiers of the Lucky 13th returned in May 1993.

Their major units included:
593rd Corps Support Group (Fort Lewis)
36th Engineer Group (Fort Benning)
7th Transportation Group (Fort Eustis)
62nd Medical Group (Fort Lewis)

Humanitarian aid and peacekeeping
From October through December 1994, 13th COSCOM soldiers provided multifunctional logistical support to Army forces supporting Operation Vigilant Warrior in Kuwait. Units of the 13th COSCOM conducted humanitarian and/or peacekeeping missions in Cuba as part of Operation Sea Signal V, Haiti Operation Uphold Democracy, Honduras JTF-B, Operation Strong Support, and were a part of Stabilization Force (SFOR) 6 in Bosnia and Herzegovina. The 13th COSCOM also deployed their engineers to Thule, Greenland, for additional support missions.

Soldiers from the command have assisted in removing snow in Massachusetts, aiding flood victims in Louisiana, processing refugees in Arkansas, fighting forest fires in Montana, assisting earthquake victims in Mexico or helping flood victims in Curio, Texas.

Following the attacks on the World Trade Center and The Pentagon, elements of the 13th COSCOM supported Operation Enduring Freedom in Afghanistan.

Operation Iraqi Freedom
Operation Iraqi Freedom again saw 13th COSCOM units deployed, including 64th Corps Support Group, directly supporting the 4th Infantry Division. Elements of the 49th Movement Control Battalion have been continuously deployed in the region since 1997 and remain a critical node supporting all U.S. and coalition forces.

13th COSCOM first deployed a medical evacuation headquarters and an air evacuation company on 12 February 2003, to Kuwait. Those units were to reposition forces as required to support the president's global war on terrorism. Eventually, the 13th COSCOM deployed both of its local Brigades in support of Operation Iraqi Freedom while the headquarters and separate units supported the families at Fort Hood, Texas.

In August 2003 deployment notification came for the soldiers of the 13th COSCOM headquarters to participate in the ongoing operations in Iraq. In preparation for its first major deployment since Somalia, the 13th COSCOM colors were cased in a deployment and retreat ceremony held on the afternoon of 18 December 2004, at Sadowski Field on Fort Hood.

OIF II 
CAMPAIGN: TRANSITION OF IRAQ - 2 May 2003 TO 28 June 2004
CAMPAIGN: IRAQI GOVERNANCE - 29 June 2004 TO 15 December 2005

On 31 January 2004, the 13th COSCOM completed a transfer of authority with the 3rd Corps Support Command (COSCOM) at Logistics Support Area (LSA) Anaconda in Balad, Iraq, and assumed responsibility to provide logistics support to Combined Joint Task Force 7 in Iraq, later redesignated as the Multi-National Corps Iraq (MNC-I).

Major units serving with the 13th COSCOM for OIF II were:
 Corps Distribution Command (Provisional)
 172nd Corps Support Group (Broken Arrow, Oklahoma)
 1st Brigade, 82nd Airborne Division(-) (January–April 2004) (Fort Bragg, North Carolina)
 81st BCT(-) (April–December 2004) (WAARNG)
 593rd Corps Support Group (Fort Lewis, Washington)
 167th Corps Support Group (Londonderry, New Hampshire)
 300th Area Support Group (Fort Lee, Virginia)
 362nd Military Police Detachment (Ashley, Pennsylvania)
 2632nd AEFTC Air Force transportation company(Joint Air force command of vehicle ops 2t1x1)
On 12 December 2004, the 13th COSCOM transferred authority to the 1st Corps Support Command. During its time at LSA Anaconda, the 13th COSCOM processed 2,000 tons of mail; averaged over 200 convoys a day for a total of 62,000 convoys involving 750,000 vehicles; and was responsible for quality of life improvements for the joint forces. The 13th COSCOM uncased its colors, signifying its return home and the end of its mission, at Fort Hood, Texas, on 21 January 2005.

OIF 06-08
CAMPAIGN: NATIONAL RESOLUTION - 16 December 2005 to 9 January 2007
CAMPAIGN: IRAQI SURGE – 10 January 2007 to 31 December 2008

The 13th, under its new designation as a sustainment command (expeditionary) deployed once again to Logistics Support Area Anaconda in August, 2006. The command provided logistics oversight for the entire Iraq theater, and assumed command and control of seven subordinate brigades, which included:

1st Brigade Combat Team, 34th Infantry Division
593rd Sustainment Brigade
82nd Sustainment Brigade
15th Sustainment Brigade
45th Sustainment Brigade
164th Corps Support Group
657th Area Support Group
81st HBCT
4th Sustainment Brigade
507th Corps Support Group

During OIF 06-08, the 13th ESC provided key logistical support to the Iraq War troop surge of 2007, and facilitated the movement and training of the additional 20,000 troops through Camp Buehring, Kuwait. The 13th ESC redeployed to Fort Hood in August, 2007, and quickly started training and preparations for their deployment in support of OIF 09-11.

OIF 09-11
CAMPAIGN: IRAQI SOVEREIGNTY – 1 January 2009 to 31 August 2010

The command headquarters again deployed to the former LSA Anaconda, now under Air Force control under the redesignation of Joint Base Balad on 17 July 2009, and assumed the mission for theater logistics on 7 August. The 13th ESC was faced with the largest movement of American forces and military equipment in more than 40 years to facilitate a responsible withdrawal from the Iraq theater of operation. Over the course of a year-long deployment, the 13th ESC brought more than $1 billion worth of equipment back into the U.S. Army supply system.

During an average day for the 13th ESC in OIF 09-11, they issued 96,000 cases of bottled water,  of fuel, and delivered 137 tons of mail.

Some of the major accomplishments of the 13th ESC during OIF 09-11 included: signing a $31 million contract with a local Iraqi company to conduct container repair, opening the first Iraqi bank on Joint Base Balad, partnering with the Iraqi transportation network to get American trucks off the road, and Operation Clean Sweep, a comprehensive effort to reduce excess throughout the entire area of operation.

Six soldiers in the command were killed in OIF 09-11: PFC Taylor Marks, SGT Earl Werner, SPC Paul Andersen, SPC Joseph Gallegos, SGT William Spencer and MAJ Ronald Culver.

15th Sustainment Brigade - TX
36th Sustainment Brigade - Texas Army National Guard
256th Infantry Brigade Combat Team - Louisiana Army National Guard
278th Armored Cavalry Regiment - TN
155 Heavy Brigade Combat Team - Mississippi
41st Infantry Brigade Combat Team - Oregon Army Nation Guard
321st Sustainment Brigade - Louisiana
287th Sustainment Brigade - Kansas
304th Sustainment Brigade - California
96th Sustainment Brigade - Utah
90th Sustainment Brigade - Arkansas
3rd Sustainment Brigade - Georgia
10th Sustainment Brigade - New York
16th Sustainment Brigade - Germany
224th Sustainment Brigade - California

Hurricane Katrina
Deep in the process of deploying and redeploying 13th COSCOM units, key elements of 13th COSCOM supported Joint Task Force Katrina/Rita hurricane relief efforts in the summer of 2005. 13th COSCOM provided 100 million rations, collected human remains with dignity, executed emergency engineering operations, transported, distributed and stored over one billion dollars in humanitarian relief from both non-governmental and federal sources from across the nation.

Numbering nearly 1,000 soldiers at the height of operations, the command and staff of the 13th COSCOM formed Logistics Task Force Lonestar, composed of several different units from the support command. Soldiers representing transportation companies, medical and engineer units, maintenance groups and others worked to bring stability back to the storm-ravaged city of New Orleans and, after Hurricane Rita came ashore, close to Lake Charles, La.

With a humanitarian support mission for the people of New Orleans, the task force performed logistical missions from purifying water to providing engineer support to help clean up the streets in support of the Federal Emergency Management Agency and Joint Task Force Katrina. Working in sometimes difficult conditions, the task force was able to accomplish many tasks during their deployment including offering remedies to supply flow issues and establishing a donation distribution warehouse.

HHC, 13th COSCOM
Special Troops Battalion
49th Transportation Battalion
4th Corps Material Management Center

Operation Enduring Freedom
In December 2011, the 13th ESC command group and portions of the headquarters company deployed to Afghanistan as augmentees to the NATO Training Mission - Afghanistan. Upon arrival, deployed members of the unit integrated into the Deputy Command of Support Operations and served both in the headquarters of the directorate at Camp Eggers in Kabul, as well as in all five regional support commands across the country, conducting logistics training and mentoring of Afghan partners. On 4 February 2012, BG Terence Hildner, Commander 13th ESC died of natural causes in Afghanistan.

Kuwait
In December 2014, the 13th ESC headquarters deployed to Camp Arifjan, Kuwait, to assume the role as the Operational Command Post for the 1st Theater Sustainment Command, with the mission to provide Theater Sustainment Mission Command to Army, Joint, and Multinational Forces in the USCENTCOM Area of Responsibility, enabling Unified Land Operations and Theater Security Cooperation. The 13th ESC supported Operations Inherent Resolve (Iraq), Freedom Sentinel (Afghanistan), Spartan Shield (Kuwait), provided logistics and sustainment support and oversight to the Multinational Forces and Observer mission - Task Force Sinai, supported USCENTCOM forward elements in Jordan, and worked in cooperation with Combined Joint Interagency Task Force - Syria (CJIATF-S) to provide support to moderate Syrian opposition forces in the fight against the Islamic State of Iraq and Syria.

Current Activities
The 13th COSCOM became the first COSCOM to transform to a Sustainment Command (Expeditionary) and deploy to combat during Operation Iraqi Freedom 06-08. The command's primary mission is to provide combat support and combat service support in the areas of supply, maintenance, movement control, field services, and general engineering & construction.

At Fort Hood, the 13th ESC currently has the missions of:
 Providing command and control of all assigned and attached units.
 Providing Combat Service Support to Fort Hood units through:
 Direct Support Maintenance to non-divisional units
 General Support maintenance and back up direct support maintenance to the 1st Cavalry Division
 Support to additional installation activities and functions, as directed.

LSOC-West

Leveraging Sustainment Organizations in CONUS West duties involve coordination with all Sustainment Brigades, Support Brigades, and Army Field Support Brigades in the Continental United States, West of the Mississippi river.

These brigades are:

 1st Sustainment Brigade – Fort Riley, Kansas
 4th Sustainment Brigade – Fort Hood, Texas
 15th Sustainment Brigade – Fort Bliss, Texas
 36th Sustainment Brigade – Texas National Guard
 43rd Sustainment Brigade – Fort Carson, Colorado
 593rd Sustainment Brigade – Fort Lewis, Washington
 916th Support Brigade – Fort Irwin, California
 404th Army Field Support Brigade – Fort Lewis, Washington
 407th Army Field Support Brigade – Fort Hood, Texas

Current leadership 

Commanding General BG Sean P. Davis
Command Sergeant Major CSM James A. LaFratta
Deputy Commander COL Matthew H. Ruedi

Organization

Currently, the 13th ESC is Fort Hood's third largest unit with a local strength of almost 6,000 soldiers. It is composed of a Medical Brigade, and two battalions:

 1st Medical Brigade
 61st Quartermaster Battalion
  49th Transportation Battalion (Movement Control)

Previous leaders

Former commanders
 COL Orval Q. Matteson
 COL Paul F. Roberts
 COL Thomas E. Wesson
 COL Chris W. Stevens
 COL (MG) William T. McLean
 COL Donald C. Poorman
 COL (MG) Leo A. Brooks Sr.
 COL Tipton
 COL (BG) William Fedorochko
 COL (GEN) Johnnie E. Wilson
 COL Brown
 COL Stirling
 BG (LTG) Billy K. Solomon
 BG (LTG) Charles S. Mahan Jr. Jun 1993 - Jun 1995
 BG Thomas R. Dickinson
 BG (LTG) Richard A. Hack 1997 - 1999
 BG (MG) Jeanette K. Edmunds 1999 - 2001
 BG (MG) William M. Lenaers Jul 2001 - Jul 2003
 BG (MG) James E. Chambers Jul 2003 - Jun 2005
 BG (MG) Michael J. Terry Jun 2005 - Sep 2007
 BG Paul L. Wentz Sep 2007 - Aug 2010
 BG Terence Hildner Aug 2010 - died 3 Feb 2012
 BG (MG) Clark W. LeMasters Jr. Apr 2012 - Jul 2014
 BG (MG) Rodney D. Fogg Jul 2014 - Jun 2016
 BG (MG) Douglas M. McBride Jr. Jun 2016 - May 2018
 BG (MG) Darren L. Werner May 2018 - Jun 2020
 BG Ronald R. Ragin Jun 2020 - Jul 2022

Former sergeants major
 SGM Joseph Cocharan
 SGM John Mitchell
 SGM Paul Quesenberry
 CSM Thomas J. Carruthers
 CSM George W. Layne
 CSM Louis Robison
 CSM Donald Horn
 CSM Joseph R. Bufford Jr.
 CSM Robert Sullivan
 CSM Pollan
 CSM Emmett Maylone
 CSM Donald W. Tucker
 CSM Joshua Hooper
 CSM Timothy O. Bowers
 CSM Daniel K. Elder
 CSM Terry Fountain
 CSM Mark D. Joseph
 CSM Terry Parham
 CSM Terry Burton
 CSM Marco A. Torres
 CSM Cheryl N. Greene
 CSM Todd M. Garner

References

External links 
 13th Sustainment Command (Expeditionary) – official site.
 13th Support Command Association – Official site for the Association for veterans of the 13th ESC, including members of the former 13th Support Brigade, the 13th COSCOM and the 13th SC(E).
 13th ESC Memorial Pavilion – Memorial honoring the soldiers of the 13th Sustainment Command killed during Operations Iraqi Freedom and Enduring Freedom.

Sustainment Commands of the United States Army
Military units and formations in Texas
Military units and formations established in 1965
Military units and formations of the Iraq War